15 Jash (meaning "15 Years", before 2004: им.15-летия Октября im. 15-letiya Oktyabrya) is a village in Osh Region of Kyrgyzstan. It is part of the Özgön District. Its population was 685 in 2021.

References

Populated places in Osh Region